This is a list of flag bearers who have represented Latvia at the Olympics.

Flag bearers carry the national flag of their country at the opening ceremony of the Olympic Games.

See also
Latvia at the Olympics

References

Latvia at the Olympics
Latvia
Olympic flagbearers